NGC 7014 is an elliptical galaxy located about 210 million light-years away from Earth in the constellation Indus. NGC 7014 was discovered by English astronomer John Herschel on October 2, 1834.

Group membership
NGC 7014 is the brightest member of Abell 3742 which is located near the center of the Pavo–Indus Supercluster.

See also  
 M87
 NGC 7002
 List of NGC objects (7001–7840)

References

External links

Elliptical galaxies
Indus (constellation)
7014
66153
Astronomical objects discovered in 1834
Abell 3742